Made in China is a 2014 South Korean drama film directed by Kim Dong-Hoo. It was written and produced by Kim Ki-duk. The film premiered at the Tokyo International Film Festival in October 2014 and later made available for rental or purchase on Amazon.com.

References

External links
 

South Korean drama films
2010s Korean-language films
2014 films
2010s South Korean films